KJAM (1390 AM, "Dakota's Best") is a radio station licensed to serve Madison, South Dakota.  The station is owned by Alpha Media, through licensee Digity 3E License, LLC. It airs a full-service Classic Hits music format with local news and information programming.

The call letters assigned by the Federal Communications Commission. are the initials of the original owner, Dr. John A. Muggly.

Notable local on-air personalities include Matt Groce, mornings; Paul Vold, mid-days; and JJ, afternoons with news and ag reports throughout the day from Brownfield and News Director Sue Bergheim.

"Dakota's Best" is the official station for Madison High School athletics, and also broadcasts Corn Belt League amateur baseball.

References

External links
KJAM official website

JAM
Classic hits radio stations in the United States
Lake County, South Dakota
Alpha Media radio stations